Baghestan-e Kandehi (also Romanized as Bāghestān-e Kandeh’ī; also known as Kandai, Kandeh, Kandī, and Kondeh) is a village in Kuhmareh Rural District, Kuhmareh District, Kazerun County, Fars Province, Iran. At the 2006 census, its population was 714, in 164 families.

References 

Populated places in Kazerun County